Mount Abdallah is a prominent 6,210-foot (1,893-meter) mountain summit located in the Alsek Ranges of the Saint Elias Mountains, in southeast Alaska. Although modest in elevation, relief is significant since the mountain rises up from tidewater in less than three miles. The mountain was named in 1892 by Harry Fielding Reid, an American geophysicist, who in 1892 hired a small crew of men for an expedition to study glaciology in Glacier Bay. There is no record of who Reid named this mountain for, but a member of his expeditionary crew who accompanied him might be a possibility. The months May through June offer the most favorable weather for viewing Mount Abdallah. Weather permitting, Mount Abdallah can be seen from Glacier Bay, which is a popular destination for cruise ships.

Climate

Based on the Köppen climate classification, Mount Abdallah has a subarctic climate with cold, snowy winters, and mild summers. Temperatures can drop below −20 °C with wind chill factors below −30 °C. This climate supports the Romer Glacier on the east slopes, and an unnamed glacier on the north flank. Precipitation runoff and meltwater from its glaciers drains into Glacier Bay Basin.

See also

List of mountain peaks of Alaska
Geography of Alaska

References

Gallery

External links
 Weather forecast: Mount Abdallah

Abdallah
Abdallah
Abdallah
Abdallah
Abdallah